Stoppelman is a surname. Notable people with the surname include:

Jeremy Stoppelman (born 1977), American business executive
Lidy Stoppelman (born 1933), Dutch figure skater